Gonçalo Bernardo Inácio (born 25 August 2001) is a Portuguese professional footballer who plays as a central defender for Primeira Liga club Sporting CP.

Early life
Growing up, he would play football wherever he could on the streets or in his house, and regularly attended Sporting CP matches with his father.

Despite not having a particular idol, Inácio looked to emulate Jérémy Mathieu.

Club career
Inácio began his career at local Almada, before moving to Sporting's academy. Prior to this, he had several trials with crosstown rivals Benfica, but ultimately decided not to join them when his father's car broke down on two occasions when he was being taken to training. On 13 January 2018, he signed his first professional contract at the age of 16.

Inácio had his first call-up to the first team on 6 July 2020, remaining unused in a goalless draw at Moreirense in the Primeira Liga; he would initially struggle to be integrated, due to being reserved by nature, but managed to succeed with the help of manager Rúben Amorim and his teammates Nuno Mendes, Eduardo Quaresma and Tiago Tomás, whom he had befriended during his time in the youth sides. He made his debut in a 2–0 away win against Portimonense on 4 October, as a 62nd-minute substitute for Zouhair Feddal.

On 20 March 2021, Inácio scored his first goal, heading home from close range in the 1–0 home victory over Vitória de Guimarães. On 23 January, he provided the assist for Pedro Porro in a 1–0 defeat of Braga to help his club win the Taça da Liga; his performance in the match impressed Amorim, with the player eventually surpassing Luís Neto in the pecking order. He played 20 times in the domestic league for the eventual champions, ending a 19-year drought.

Inácio was named defender of the month for December 2021. The following 29 January, his second-half header helped his team come from behind to defeat Benfica 2–1 in the league cup final. On 1 April, he agreed to an extension until 2026.

International career
Inácio represented Portugal at under-17, under-18, under-19, under-20 and under-21 levels, for a total of 19 caps. He was called up to the senior side by Fernando Santos on 26 August 2021, for 2022 FIFA World Cup qualifiers against Azerbaijan and the Republic of Ireland and a friendly with Qatar. Four days later, however, he was dropped from the squad after picking up an injury on his left thigh.

On 12 November 2021, Inácio made his under-21 debut, playing the entire 1–0 win in Cyprus in the 2023 UEFA European Championship qualifying stage. He scored his first goal in the reverse fixture four days later, in a 6–0 rout in Faro.

In October 2022, Inácio was named in a preliminary 55-man squad for the 2022 FIFA World Cup in Qatar.

Career statistics

Club

Honours
Sporting CP
Primeira Liga: 2020–21
Taça da Liga: 2020–21, 2021–22
Supertaça Cândido de Oliveira: 2021

Individual
Primeira Liga Defender of the Month: December 2021
SJPF Young Player of the Month: November 2021

References

External links
Sporting official profile 

2001 births
Living people
Sportspeople from Almada
Portuguese footballers
Association football defenders
Primeira Liga players
Sporting CP footballers
Portugal youth international footballers
Portugal under-21 international footballers